The Fews (from Irish: na Feá/Feadha, meaning "the woods" ) is a former Irish barony in County Armagh, modern-day Northern Ireland, based on the territory of the O'Neills of the Fews. It was at a later period divided into the baronies of Fews Lower and Fews Upper.

Sometimes known as the Highlands of South Armagh, it was historically a rough and dangerous area, populated by Gaelic clans. There were only a few safe and guarded passes through these hills and they included Jerrettspass and Poyntzpass, both named due to their historic role as passes through the hills and bogland. It was settled mostly by Scots with names such as McClelland, Sterritt, Morrow, Hamilton and Atkinson during the Plantation of Ulster.

References

Geography of County Armagh